Charles Francis McCarthy  was an American newspaper reporter and politician who served in the Massachusetts Great and General Court and as the  eighteenth Mayor of Marlborough, Massachusetts.

Spanish American War
McCarthy served from May 18, 1898 – January 21, 1899 in Company F., Sixth Massachusetts Regiment during the Spanish–American War, attaining the rank of corporal. McCarthy was deployed along with his regiment to Puerto Rico where they disembarked on July 25, 1898.  McCarthy was mustered out of service on January 21, 1899.

Massachusetts House of Representatives
McCarthy served as a Democrat to represent Marlborough in the Ninth Middlesex District of the Massachusetts House of Representatives.  While in the House, McCarthy served on the Mercantile Affairs Committee.

Massachusetts Senate
McCarthy served in the Massachusetts State Senate from 1912 to 1914.

Massachusetts Constitutional Convention of 1917
In 1916 the Massachusetts legislature and electorate approved the calling of a Constitutional Convention.  In May 1917, McCarthy was elected to serve as a member of the Massachusetts Constitutional Convention of 1917, representing the 9th Middlesex District of the Massachusetts House of Representatives.  McCarthy served on the Convention's committee on Military Affairs.

McCarthy is reported as having made a Memorial Day address at the Town Hall on May 29, 1933.

See also 
 134th Massachusetts General Court (1913)

Notes

Mayors of Marlborough, Massachusetts
1876 births
Democratic Party members of the Massachusetts House of Representatives
Massachusetts city council members
American military personnel of the Spanish–American War
American male journalists
Members of the 1917 Massachusetts Constitutional Convention
Democratic Party Massachusetts state senators
Year of death missing